The EuroLeague Women is an international basketball club competition for elite women's clubs throughout Europe. The 2007-2008 season features 24 competing teams from 13 different countries. The draw for the groups was held on August 5, 2007 at the Kempinski Hotel in Munich. The competition began on November 7, 2007. The 2008 Final Four is scheduled for April 11–13, 2008.

Teams of the 2007-2008 Euroleague Women

Format

Regular season
The first phase is a regular season, in which the competing teams are drawn into four groups, each containing six teams. Each team plays every other team in its group at home and away, resulting in 10 games for each team in the first stage. The top 4 teams in each group advance to the next round. The complete list of tiebreakers is provided in the lead-in to the Regular Season results.

Eighth-Final
The top 4 teams from each froup advance to the next Eighth-Final Play-offs. Each round will be played at two games (home and away) or three games (if necessary, score 1-1, by winning at home, and losing at away) to advance to the next stage.

Quarter-final
The winners from Eighth-Final advance to Quarter-Finals. Round will be played at two games (home and away) or three games (if necessary score 1-1, by winning at home, and losing at away) to advance to the final Four.

Final four
The Final Four will meet four teams, winners of quarter-finals. It semifinals and finals (third place game). It will be on April 11 and April 14.

Regular season
Tiebreakers:
Head-to-head record in matches between the tied clubs
Overall goal average in games between the tied clubs (points scored divided by points allowed)
Overall goal average in all group matches (first tiebreaker if tied clubs are not in the same group)

Group A

Group B

Group C

Group D

Knockout stage

EighthFinals

QuarterFinals

 if necessary

Final four

The Final Four is the last phase of each Euroleague Women season, and is held over a weekend. The semifinal games are played on Friday evening. Sunday starts with the third-place game, followed by the championship final.

Bracket

Individual leaders

Points

Rebounds

Assists

References

External links
Official site

 
 
2007-08